Ken Starr (1946–2022) was an American lawyer, educational administrator, and federal judge.

Ken Starr or Kenneth Starr may also refer to:

 Kenn Starr, American rapper
 Kenny Starr (born 1952), American country singer
 Kenneth I. Starr (born 1943/1944), American former certified public accountant and disbarred attorney

See also
 Kenneth Sarr (1895–1967), Irish writer and judge